Broxtowe Borough Council elections are held every four years. Broxtowe Borough Council is the local authority for the non-metropolitan district of Borough of Broxtowe in Nottinghamshire, England. Since the last boundary changes in 2015, 44 councillors are elected from 20 wards.

Political control
The first election to the council was held in 1973, initially operating as a shadow authority before coming into its powers on 1 April 1974. Since 1973 political control of the council has been held by the following parties:

Leadership
The leaders of the council since 1995 have been:

Council elections
1973 Broxtowe District Council election
1976 Broxtowe Borough Council election (New ward boundaries)
1979 Broxtowe Borough Council election
1983 Broxtowe Borough Council election
1987 Broxtowe Borough Council election (Borough boundary changes took place but the number of seats remained the same)
1991 Broxtowe Borough Council election
1995 Broxtowe Borough Council election (Borough boundary changes took place but the number of seats remained the same)
1999 Broxtowe Borough Council election – Labour 27, Liberal Democrats 11, Conservative 10, Independent 1
2003 Broxtowe Borough Council election (New ward boundaries) – Labour 15, Conservative 14, Liberal Democrats 13, Independent 2
2007 Broxtowe Borough Council election – Conservative 16, Liberal Democrats 15, Labour 10 (including the results of a delayed election), Independent 2, British National Party 1
2011 Broxtowe Borough Council election
2015 Broxtowe Borough Council election (New ward boundaries)
2019 Broxtowe Borough Council election

Borough result maps

Wards
Since boundary changes in 2015, 44 councillors have been elected from 20 wards. Each ward returns one to three councillors to the Borough Council, depending on the ward's electorate/population. Below is a summary list of the 20 wards and the number of councillors they each elect in brackets.

Attenborough and Chilwell East (3) †
Awsworth Cossall and Trowell(2)
Beeston Central (2) †
Beeston North (2) † - includes a very small part of Wollaton
Beeston Rylands (2) †
Beeston West (2) †
Bramcote (3) † - includes a small part of Wollaton
Brinsley (1)
Chilwell West (3) †
Eastwood Hall (1)
Eastwood Hill Top (2)
Eastwood St Mary's (2)
Greasley (3)
Kimberley (3)
Nuthall East & Strelley (2)
(Watnall) & Nuthall West (2)
Stapleford North (2)
Stapleford South East (2)
Stapleford South West (2)
Toton & Chilwell Meadows (3) †

† These wards form the unparished area of the borough.

By-election results
By-elections take place when a vacancy occurs between the regular four-yearly elections.

1995–1999

1999–2003

2003–2007

2007–2011

2011-2015

2015-2019

2019-2023

References

By-election results

External links
Broxtowe Borough Council

 
Borough of Broxtowe
Council elections in Nottinghamshire
District council elections in England